Copadichromis quadrimaculatus is a species of haplochromine cichlid which is endemic to Lake Malawi. It is found throughout the lake in Malawi, Mozambique, and Tanzania.

References

quadrimaculatus
Fish described in 1922
Taxa named by Charles Tate Regan
Taxonomy articles created by Polbot